The 2022–23 Northern Illinois Huskies men's basketball team represented Northern Illinois University in the 2022–23 NCAA Division I men's basketball season. The Huskies were led by second-year head coach Rashon Burno.  They played their home games at the Convocation Center in DeKalb, Illinois as members of the Mid-American Conference. As the seventh seed in the MAC tournament they lost to Kent State in the first round to finish the season 13–19 and 9–9 in the MAC.

Previous season

The Huskies finished the 2021–22 season 9–21, 6–14 in MAC play to finish a tie for ninth place. They failed to qualify for the MAC tournament.

Offseason

Departures

Incoming transfers

Recruiting class

Roster

Schedule and results

|-
!colspan=9 style=|Exhibition

|-
!colspan=9 style=|Non-conference regular season

|-
!colspan=9 style=| MAC regular season

|-
!colspan=9 style=| MAC tournament

Source

References

Northern Illinois Huskies men's basketball seasons
Northern Illinois Huskies
Northern Illinois Huskies men's basketball
Northern Illinois Huskies men's basketball